Janina is a Mexican telenovela produced by Televisa for Telesistema Mexicano in 1962.

Cast 
 María Rivas ...	Janina
 Aldo Monti ... Rodolfo 
 Anita Blanch			
 Augusto Benedico			
 Guillermo Aguilar			
 Andrea Palma		
 José Gálvez		
 Jacqueline Andere ... Gladys 
 Chela Nájera			
 Zoila Quiñones			
 Guillermo Ríos			
 Carlos Rotzinger

References

External links 

Mexican telenovelas
1962 telenovelas
Televisa telenovelas
1962 Mexican television series debuts
1962 Mexican television series endings
Spanish-language telenovelas